The 1932 West Virginia gubernatorial election took place on November 8, 1932, to elect the governor of West Virginia. J. Alfred Taylor unsuccessfully ran for the Democratic nomination.

Results

References

1932
gubernatorial
West Virginia
November 1932 events in the United States